The 1996 First-Year Player Draft, Major League Baseball's annual amateur draft of high school and college baseball players, was held on June 4 and 5, 1996. A total of 1740 players were drafted over the course of 100 rounds.

This is the only draft to last 100 rounds. The last player taken was outfielder Aron Amundson, drafted by the New York Yankees in the 100th round.

This draft is also notable because a record four first-round draft picks were not offered contracts by the teams that drafted them and subsequently became free agents.

First round selections

Supplemental first round selections

Compensation picks

Other notable players 

Jacque Jones, 2nd round, 37th overall by the Minnesota Twins
Milton Bradley, 2nd round, 40th overall by the Montreal Expos
Jimmy Rollins, 2nd round, 46th overall by the Philadelphia Phillies
Chad Durbin, 3rd round, 79th overall by the Kansas City Royals
Scott Schoeneweis, 3rd round, 85th overall by the California Angels
Shawn Chacón, 3rd round, 90th overall by the Colorado Rockies
Alex Cora, 3rd round, 88th overall by the Los Angeles Dodgers
Nick Johnson, 3rd round, 89th overall by the New York Yankees
Robert Fick, 5th round, 131st overall by the Detroit Tigers
Joe Crede, 5th round, 137th overall by the Chicago White Sox
Brad Penny, 5th round, 155th overall by the Arizona Diamondbacks
Jeremy Giambi, 6th round, 169th overall by the Kansas City Royals
Casey Blake, 7th round, 189th overall by the Toronto Blue Jays
Mark DeRosa, 7th round, 212th overall by the Atlanta Braves
Willie Bloomquist, 8th round, 237th overall by the Seattle Mariners, but did not sign
Justin Duchscherer, 8th round, 241st overall by the Boston Red Sox
Doug Davis, 10th round, 293rd overall by the Texas Rangers
Shea Hillenbrand, 10th round, 301st overall by the Boston Red Sox
John McDonald, 12th round, 363rd overall by the Cleveland Indians
Chad Bradford, 13th round, 377th overall by the Chicago White Sox
Jamey Carroll, 14th round, 400th overall by the Montreal Expos
Kevin Gregg, 15th round, 435th overall by the Oakland Athletics
Josh Towers, 15th round, 441st overall by the Baltimore Orioles
Mike Gonzalez, 17th round, 486th overall by the Pittsburgh Pirates, but did not sign
Mark Hendrickson, 19th round, 563rd overall by the Texas Rangers, but did not sign
Wade Miller, 20th round, 594th overall by the Houston Astros
Mike MacDougal, 22nd round, 651st overall by the Baltimore Orioles, but did not sign
Aaron Harang, 22nd round, 661st overall by the Boston Red Sox, but did not sign
Roy Oswalt, 23rd round, 684th overall by the Houston Astros
Ted Lilly, 23rd round, 688th overall by the Los Angeles Dodgers
Joe Beimel, 26th round, 773rd overall by the Texas Rangers, but did not sign
Kiko Calero, 27th round, 799th overall by the Kansas City Royals
Willie Harris, 28th round, 816th overall by the Pittsburgh Pirates, but did not sign
Kyle Lohse, 29th round, 862nd overall by the Chicago Cubs
Marcus Thames, 30th round, 899th overall by the New York Yankees
Freddy Sanchez, 30th round, 902nd overall by the Atlanta Braves, but did not sign
Mike Lamb, 31st round, 907th overall by the Minnesota Twins, but did not sign
Travis Hafner, 31st round, 923rd overall by the Texas Rangers
Orlando Hudson, 33rd round, 969th overall by the Toronto Blue Jays, but did not sign
Matt Guerrier, 33rd round, 979th overall by the Kansas City Royals, but did not sign
Dan Wheeler, 34th round, 1024th overall by the Tampa Bay Devil Rays
Jason Michaels, 44th round, 1314th overall by the Tampa Bay Devil Rays, but did not sign
Chris Capuano, 45th round, 1316th overall by the Pittsburgh Pirates, but did not sign
Juan Pierre, 48th round, 1406th overall by the Seattle Mariners, but did not sign
Greg Dobbs, 52nd round, 1492nd overall by the Seattle Mariners, but did not sign
Rob Mackowiak, 53rd round, 1498th overall by the Pittsburgh Pirates
Marcus Giles, 53rd round, 1511th overall by the Atlanta Braves
Jason Jennings, 54th round, 1531st overall by the Arizona Diamondbacks, but did not sign
David Riske, 56th round, 1559th overall by the Cleveland Indians
Barry Zito, 59th round, 1587th overall by the Seattle Mariners, but did not sign
Geoff Duncan, 69th round, 1647th overall by the Florida Marlins
Travis Phelps, 89th round, 1721st overall by the Tampa Bay Devil Rays
Clay Condrey, 94th round, 1730th overall by the New York Yankees, but did not sign. Condrey is the lowest drafted player to ever appear in a major league game.

NFL player drafted 
Quincy Carter, 2nd round, 52nd overall by the Chicago Cubs

See also
Major League Baseball
Major League Baseball Draft
List of MLB first overall draft choices
Rule 5 Draft

External links
Complete draft list from The Baseball Cube database
MLB.com's section on the draft

Major League Baseball draft
Draft
Major League Baseball draft